Alexandros Kartalis (born 29 January 1995) is a Greek professional footballer who plays as a midfielder for Super League club Volos.

Career 
On 5 July 2019, he joined PAS Giannina.

On 14 June 2021, he joined Atromitos F.C.

Career statistics

Club

Honours
PAS Giannina
 Super League Greece 2: 2019–20

References

External links
 

German people of Greek descent
Sportspeople of Greek descent
Citizens of Greece through descent
German footballers
Greek footballers
Greek expatriate footballers
Association football defenders
SpVgg Greuther Fürth players
VfR Aalen players
FSV Zwickau players
PAS Giannina F.C. players
Atromitos F.C. players
Regionalliga players
3. Liga players
Footballers from Nuremberg
1995 births
Living people